HMS Telemachus was a R-class destroyer of the British Royal Navy that took part in the First World War. She was built in 1916–1917 by the Scottish shipbuilder John Brown at their Clydebank shipyard. Telemachus was modified to serve as a minelayer, laying minefields in the German Bight and English Channel to restrict the operation of German submarines. The ship survived the war and was sold for scrap in 1927.

Design
The R-class was a further development of the M-class destroyer, which had been the last class of destroyers ordered for the Royal Navy before the start of the First World War, and had therefore been built in large numbers during the early years of the war.  The R-class differed by having geared rather than direct drive steam turbines, giving greater fuel efficiency, having a higher forecastle for better seakeeping and a larger and more robust bridge structure.

Three Yarrow water-tube boilers fed steam to Brown-Curtis geared steam turbines which drove two propeller shafts.

The ships were armed with three 4-inch (102 mm) QF Mk IV guns, together with one 2-pounder pom-pom anti-aircraft autocannon. Two twin 21-inch (533mm torpedo tubes were fitted. The ships had a crew of 82. As converted to a minelayer, Telemachuss aft gun and one of the pairs of torpedo-tubes were removed to allow 40 mines to be carried. The armament could be re-instated in about 12 hours to allow operation as a normal destroyer.

Telemachus was one of 15 R-class destroyers ordered in March 1916 as part of the 8th Emergency War programme. She was laid down on 12 April 1916 at John Brown & Co.'s Clydebank shipyard. In January 1917 it was decided to convert Telemachus to a minelayer while she was still under construction. Telemachus was launched on 21 April 1917 and completed in June 1917.

Service
On commissioning, Telemachus  joined the 13th Destroyer Flotilla of the Grand Fleet, based at Rosyth. Telemachus combined the flotilla's normal duties in support of the Grand Fleet's battlecruisers with minelaying operations, frequently converting between normal destroyer and minelayer configuration. On the return journey, Tarpon struck a mine, badly damaging her stern, and had to be towed back to Dunkirk by Thruster. This minefield may have caused the loss of the German submarine , which failed to return from a mission to lay mines off Calais, departing Zeebrugge on 18 July and was due back on 20 July. On 1–10 October 1917,  Telemachus took place in a large scale operation to intercept German submarines on their way home through the North Sea, with destroyers patrolling a line of mine-nets which were hoped to catch any passing submarine. At the time it was thought the operation accounted for three submarines (U-50, U-66 and U-106) but in fact these submarines were sunk elsewhere. On 13 October, the Swedish barque Esmerelda, sailing for the Tyne with a load of pit-props, was sunk by the German submarine UB-58. Telemachus spotted the burning Esmerelda and rescued her crew.

While she served with the 13th Flotilla, Telemachuss minelaying duties mainly lay in the approaches to the Belgian ports rather than longer-ranged missions to the German Bight. In February 1918, Telemachus  joined the newly established 20th Flotilla, tasked with laying mines in channels swept by the Germans in the existing British minefields in the German Bight. As well as the direct effects of ships sunk by the mines, these mines would require considerable effort by the Germans in clearing them.

The three trawlers did not realise that the destroyers were British until they had finished laying their minefield, when they signalled by radio the presence of the British ships. Telemachus went to seize one of the trawlers, which the Germans scuttled, while the remaining two German ships were captured by the British and then scuttled. Telemachus collided with Sandfly and Tarpon with Ariel. While Telemachus, Tarpon and Ariel sustained little damage, Sandfly was holed in the engine room, and had to be towed back to England by Ferret, escorted by Telemachus.

The 20th Flotilla, including Telemachus, was carrying another minelaying operation on the night of 2–3 August 1918 when the destroyer  struck a mine, blowing off her bow. Abdiel was preparing to take Vehement under tow when a second destroyer, Ariel was also mined.  Ariel quickly sank, and it proved impossible to salvage Vehement, which was scuttled by Telemachus and  using gunfire and depth charges. The squadron continued minelaying until the end of the war, with Telemachus laying a total of 1898 mines during the war.

Telemachus remained in use after the war as an experimental minelayer, but was sold for scrap to Hughes Bolckow at Blyth on 26 July 1927.

Pennant numbers

Notes

Citations

Bibliography

R-class destroyers (1916)
1917 ships
Ships built on the River Clyde